José Manuel Fernández Reyes (born 18 November 1989 in Córdoba, Andalusia) is a Spanish professional footballer who plays as a right-back.

External links

1989 births
Living people
Spanish footballers
Footballers from Córdoba, Spain
Association football defenders
La Liga players
Segunda División players
Tercera División players
Segunda Federación players
Córdoba CF B players
Córdoba CF players
Real Zaragoza players
Real Oviedo players
Hércules CF players
Cypriot First Division players
AEK Larnaca FC players
Spanish expatriate footballers
Expatriate footballers in Cyprus
Spanish expatriate sportspeople in Cyprus